The 2001–02 Czech Cup was the ninth season of the annual football knock-out tournament of the Czech Republic. Winners Slavia Prague qualified for the 2002–03 UEFA Cup.

Teams

Preliminary round
38 teams were originally scheduled to take part in the preliminary round; however, the match between Rousínov and Dosta Bystrc was not played and both teams advanced to round 1 along with the winners of the other 18 matches.

|}

Round 1
78 teams entered the competition at this stage. Along with the 18 winners from the preliminary round, these teams played 48 matches to qualify for the second round.

|}

Round 2

|}

Round 3
The third round was played between 6 October and 13 November 2001.

|}

Round 4
The fourth round was played between 5 and 13 March 2002.

|}

Quarterfinals
The quarterfinals were played on 2 and 3 April 2002.

|}

Semifinals
The semifinals were played on 23 and 24 April 2002.

|}

Final

See also
 2001–02 Czech First League
 2001–02 Czech 2. Liga

References

External links
 Official site 
 Czech Republic Cup 2001/02 at RSSSF.com

2001–02
2001–02 domestic association football cups
Cup